Kabe may refer to:

People 
 Alhaji Kabe (died 1753), Sultan of Kano
 Kazimierz Bein (1872–1959), Polish Esperanto author, translator and ophthalmologist
 Masayoshi Kabe (1949–2020), Japanese musician
 Miran Kabe (born 1992), Japanese football player

Transport 
 Kabe Line, in Hiroshima, Japan
 Kabe Station (Hiroshima), Japan
 Kabe Station (Tokyo), Japan
 Lehigh Valley International Airport, in Pennsylvania, United States

Other uses 
 Kabe Constituency, Namibia
 KABE-CD, a television station licensed to Bakersfield, California, United States
 Kabe, a character in Star Wars portrayed by Rusty Goffe